Chalmers Award may refer to:

 An early version of the Major League Baseball Most Valuable Player Award, presented from 1911 to 1914
 a series of Canadian arts awards funded by the Chalmers family of arts patrons, including:
 The Floyd S. Chalmers Canadian Play Award
 The M. Joan Chalmers Awards for Arts Administration, Artistic Direction and Documentary Film and Video
 Chalmers Medal awarded by the Royal Society of Tropical Medicine and Hygiene